Javier Salgado Martín, more commonly known as Javi Salgado, is a retired Spanish professional basketball player.

Early career
After being formed at Maristas school in Bilbao, Salgado started his career at SD Patronato in 1998. The next year, he signed with Baloncesto León, to play in the club's reserve team (Elmar León), in the Liga EBA, in that time the Spanish third division.

Professional career
In 2001, Salgado joined the newly created team in his native town: Bilbao Basket. With this team, he would go on to play during the next ten seasons, in three different level leagues on the Spanish basketball league system: LEB Plata, LEB Oro, and Liga ACB, playing also in two EuroCup semifinals, in 2009 and 2010.

After leaving the team in summer 2010, his number 14 jersey was retired at Bilbao Basket. He signed with Lagun Aro GBC in July 2010, from Bilbao's neighboring city of San Sebastián.

On July 18, 2016, he returned to Dominion Bilbao Basket, where he remained until he retired at the end of the 2017-18 ACB season.

Spain national team
Salgado played with the Spain national under-20 basketball team, and he also played in several friendly games with the Basque Country autonomous basketball team.

Awards and accomplishments
LEB Plata: (1)
2002
Copa LEB Plata: (1)
2002
LEB Oro: (1)
2004

References

External links
Profile at ACB.com 

1980 births
Living people
Bilbao Basket players
CB Estudiantes players
Gipuzkoa Basket players
Liga ACB players
Point guards
Spanish men's basketball players
Sportspeople from Bilbao
Basketball players from the Basque Country (autonomous community)